Strawberry Fields High School is a private school in Chandigarh, India, affiliated to the Indian Certificate of Secondary Education and Indian School Certificate (ISC). It is also accredited by the International Baccalaureate (IB) to award IB Diplomas. 

It is located in Sector 26, Chandigarh and admits students from Kindergarten to Grade 12. It also has a junior wing in Sector 24, Chandigarh.

See also
Education in India
Literacy in India
List of institutions of higher education in Punjab, India

References

External links
 Strawberry Fields High School – Official Website

Private schools in Chandigarh